NGC 2354 is an open cluster in the constellation Canis Major. It lies 2 degrees southwest from NGC 2362 and northeast of Delta Canis Majoris. About 15 member stars are visible through binoculars.

References

External links
 

Canis Major
2354
Open clusters